Michael Alan Chalenski (born January 28, 1970 in Elizabeth, New Jersey) is a former professional American football defensive lineman who spent six seasons with the Philadelphia Eagles, the New York Jets, the Miami Dolphins, and the Detroit Lions.

Raised in Kenilworth, New Jersey, Chalenski played prep football at David Brearley High School.

References

1970 births
Living people
People from Kenilworth, New Jersey
Sportspeople from Elizabeth, New Jersey
Players of American football from New Jersey
American football defensive tackles
American football defensive ends
Philadelphia Eagles players
New York Jets players
Miami Dolphins players
Detroit Lions players
UCLA Bruins football players